Mesangiospermae (core angiosperms) is a clade of flowering plants (angiosperms), informally called "mesangiosperms". They are one of two main groups of angiosperms. It is a name created under the rules of the PhyloCode system of phylogenetic nomenclature. There are about 350,000 species of mesangiosperms. The mesangiosperms contain about 99.95% of the flowering plants, assuming that there are about 175 species not in this group and about 350,000 that are. While such a clade with a similar circumscription exists in the APG III system, it was not given a name.

Phylogeny 
Besides the mesangiosperms, the other groups of flowering plants are Amborellales, Nymphaeales, and Austrobaileyales. These constitute a paraphyletic grade called basal angiosperms. The order names, ending in -ales are used here without reference to taxonomic rank because these groups contain only one order.

Mesangiospermae includes the following clades:
 Ceratophyllales
 Chloranthales
 eudicots  
 magnoliidae
 monocots

Name
The mesangiosperms are usually recognized in classification systems that do not assign groups to taxonomic rank. The name Mesangiospermae is a branch-modified node-based name in phylogenetic nomenclature. It is defined as the most inclusive crown clade containing Platanus occidentalis, but not Amborella trichopoda, Nymphaea odorata, or Austrobaileya scandens. It is sometimes written as /Mesangiospermae even though this is not required by the PhyloCode. The "clademark" slash indicates that the term is intended as phylogenetically defined.

Description

In molecular phylogenetic studies, the mesangiosperms are always strongly supported as a monophyletic group. There is no distinguishing characteristic which is found in all mature mesangiosperms but which is not found in any of the basal angiosperms. Nevertheless, the mesangiosperms are recognizable in the earliest stage of embryonic development. The ovule contains a megagametophyte, also known as an embryo sac, that is bipolar in structure and contains 8 cell nuclei. The antipodal cells are persistent, and the endosperm is triploid.

History

The oldest known fossils of flowering plants are fossil mesangiosperms from the Hauterivian stage of the Cretaceous period.

Molecular clock comparisons of DNA sequences indicate that the mesangiosperms originated between 140 and 150 Mya (million years ago) near the beginning of the Cretaceous period. This was about 25 Ma (million years) after the origin of the angiosperms in the mid-Jurassic.

By 135Mya, the mesangiosperms had radiated into 5 groups: Chloranthales, Magnoliids, Monocots, Ceratophyllales, and Eudicots. The radiation into 5 groups probably occurred in about 4 million years.

Because the interval of this radiation (about 4 million years) is short in proportion to its age (about 145 million years), it had long appeared that the 5 groups of mesangiosperms had arisen simultaneously. The mesangiosperms were shown as an unresolved pentatomy in phylogenetic trees. In 2007, two studies attempted to resolve the phylogenetic relationships among these 5 groups by comparing large portions of their chloroplast genomes. These studies agreed on the most likely phylogeny for the mesangiosperms. In this phylogeny, the monocots are sister to the clade [Ceratophyllales + eudicots]. However, this result is not strongly supported. The approximately unbiased topology test showed that some of the other possible positions of the monocots had more than 5% probability of being correct. The major weakness of these 2 studies was the small number of species whose DNA was being used in the phylogenetic analysis, 45 in one study and 64 in the other. This was unavoidable, because complete chloroplast genome sequences are known for only a few plants.

References

Bibliography

External links 
 Angiosperm Phylogeny at Missouri Botanical Garden 
 Electronic Supplement to Cantino et alii
  Divergence Times  T. Jonathan Davies et alii. (2004). PNAS 101(7):1904-1909.
 chloroplast genome list In: Montreal genomics

Angiosperms
Plant unranked clades